An  is a defeated warrior that fled the enemy.

An ochimusha is considered a low-class citizen, no longer at the level of a samurai, since he fled battle instead of committing seppuku. In some instances, it is said that to escape safely, those warriors hid themselves in mountain villages.

According to folklore, during the Sengoku period, ochimusha were hunted by farmers who wanted their belongings or to take the reward usually offered for the severed head of enemies.

Instead of only occurring during battle times, samurais and aristocrats whose support is no longer needed can also become an ochimusha, if attacked by the townspeople of the region under their protection. There are tales of samurai mansions being plundered.

A criminal that goes into exile is also subject to becoming an ochimusha.

They also used to be called  in some parts of Kansai, but this term is no longer in use due to derogatory connotations.

Appearance
The iconography usually represents the ochimusha with the crown of his head shaved and the rest of the hair long and loose, a dissolved chonmage (topknot). The dissolved chonmage would then mean losing the social status of the samurai.
Arrows stuck in the body is also a common motif.

Modern usage
In modern times, the term is used to refer to politicians that lose an election, while the term "ochimusha hunting" is used in regard to a candidate caught cheating in an election or to corrupt politicians that have been arrested.

Sometimes, the term is also used to refer to people with a bald top head and stretched hair on the sides.

References

Japanese folklore